Borzya (Boorjo; , Boorj) is a town and the administrative center of Borzinsky District in Zabaykalsky Krai, Russia, located  southeast of Chita, the administrative center of the krai. Population:

Geography

Climate
Borzya has a humid continental climate (Köppen climate classification Dwb) bordering on a subarctic climate (Köppen climate classification Dwc) and a semi-arid climate (Köppen climate classification BSk), with severely cold winters and warm summers. Precipitation is quite low but is significantly higher from June to September than at other times of the year.

History
Although there had been human settlement on the present site of the town since the 18th century, the modern town began with the construction of the Trans-Siberian Railway in 1899. The settlement around the Borzya railway station was officially opened in 1900, named Suvorovsky in honor of Alexander Suvorov. This name, however, was not widely used by the residents, who continued to use the same name as the railway station and the river. The name Borzya was eventually made official when the settlement was granted town status in 1950.

Administrative and municipal status
Within the framework of administrative divisions, Borzya serves as the administrative center of Borzinsky District, to which it is directly subordinated. As a municipal division, the town of Borzya, together with one rural locality (the crossing loop of Zun-Torey), is incorporated within Borzinsky Municipal District as Borzinskoye  Urban Settlement.

Economy
Besides the railway workshops, employers in the town include food production enterprised, particularly meat production from the livestock industry in the surrounding area.

The Kharanor brown coal open-pit mine is located northwest of the town, providing fuel for power generation.

Transportation
The town is on the original stretch of the Trans-Siberian Railway which crossed Manchuria on its way to Vladivostok and was known as the Chinese Eastern Railway. This route was later bypassed by the current Trans-Siberian, which is entirely on the Russian territory, but the original line passing through Borzya is still used for passenger and freight traffic to and from China.

Military
The town was the headquarters of the 36th Army of the Russian Ground Forces until 2009.

The airbases of the Borzya-2 (air base) and Arabatuk (air base) are nearby.

References

Notes

Sources

External links
Official website of Borzya 
Borzya Business Directory 

Cities and towns in Zabaykalsky Krai
1900 establishments in the Russian Empire